Ježek may refer to:

People:
Frane Milčinski, a Slovene writer that used the pen name Ježek
Ježek (surname), various people with the surname Ježek

Other:
27132 Ježek, a main belt asteroid
Czech hedgehog, a static anti-tank obstacle defence